In the mathematical theory of matroids, a paving matroid is a matroid in which every circuit has size at least as large as the matroid's rank. In a matroid of rank  every circuit has size at most , so it is equivalent to define paving matroids as the matroids in which the size of every circuit belongs to the set . It has been conjectured that almost all matroids are paving matroids.

Examples
Every simple matroid of rank three is a paving matroid; for instance this is true of the Fano matroid.  The Vámos matroid provides another example, of rank four.

Uniform matroids of rank  have the property that every circuit is of length exactly  and hence are all paving matroids; the converse does not hold, for example, the cycle matroid of the complete graph  is paving but not uniform.

d-Partitions
If a paving matroid has rank , then its hyperplanes form a set system known as a -partition.

Combinatorial enumeration
Combinatorial enumeration of the simple matroids on up to nine elements has shown that a large fraction of them are also paving matroids. On this basis, it has been conjectured that almost all matroids are paving matroids. More precisely, according to this conjecture, the limit, as n goes to infinity, of the ratio between the number of paving matroids and the number of all matroids should equal one. If so, the same statement can be made for the sparse paving matroids, matroids that are both paving and dual to a paving matroid. Although this remains open, a similar statement on the asymptotic ratio of the logarithms of the numbers of matroids and sparse paving matroids has been proven.

History
In their 1970 book Combinatorial Geometries, Henry Crapo and Gian-Carlo Rota observed that these structures were matroidal; the name "paving matroid" was introduced by  following a suggestion of Rota.

The simpler structure of paving matroids, compared to arbitrary matroids, has allowed some facts about them to be proven that remain elusive in the more general case. An example is Rota's basis conjecture, the statement that a set of n disjoint bases in a rank-n matroid can be arranged into an n × n matrix so that the rows of the matrix are the given bases and the columns are also bases. It has been proven true for paving matroids, but remains open for most other matroids.

Notes

References
.
.
.

.
. Reprinted 2010.

Matroid theory